Fernando Alfredo Seguignol Garcia (born January 19, 1975) is a former Major League Baseball first baseman and outfielder. Seguignol also played eight years in Nippon Professional Baseball. A switch hitter, Seguignol is regarded as the best switch-hitter ever to play in Japan, along with Orestes Destrade.

Playing career
Yankees minor league manager Trey Hillman recommended Seguignol try switch-hitting. (Years later, Hillman became the manager of the Hokkaido Nippon-Ham Fighters, and was reunited with Seguignol in Japan.)

He made appearances as a first baseman and designated hitter with the BlueWave, and hit home runs from both sides of the plate two games in a row, from June 5 to June 6 (becoming the first player to do so in Japanese baseball history). However, Seguignol was inconsistent overall, ending the season with a .204 batting average. He was released at the end of the season, and returned to the major leagues after signing with the New York Yankees.

He hit well over .400 in his first month, and ended the year hitting .306 with 44 home runs and 108 RBI, tying Nobuhiko Matsunaka for the most home runs in the league to win the Best Nine Award at designated hitter.

In , he played for Olmecas de Tabasco in Liga Mexicana de Beisbol before signing with the Detroit Tigers on June 12, 2008; he was released by the Tigers on July 21. But about a week after his release, he was acquired by the Tohoku Rakuten Golden Eagles. He hit 13 home runs in 39 games (157 at-bats), with a .324 batting average and 40 RBI in that season. He was chosen on the 1st round roster for Panama team playing in 2009 World Baseball Classic.

In 2010, after playing for the Newark Bears, he played for the Orix Buffaloes in the Japanese Pacific League, where he had previously played in 2002.

Seguignol holds the Japanese single-season record for home runs among switch-hitters (44), and homered from both sides of the plate eight separate times in Japan, an NPB all-time record. He also homered against 13 different Japanese teams; the only other player to have done this is Julio Zuleta.

Post-playing career
On November 2, 2021, Seguignol was hired by the Saitama Seibu Lions to be in charge of the team's international affairs, stationed in the USA.

Personal life 
Seguignol is married and has two children, Kendall and Jabari.  He lives in Wellington, Florida.

References

External links
 , or Retrosheet, or Pelota Binaria (Venezuelan Winter League)

1975 births
Living people
Albany Polecats players
Columbus Clippers players
Delmarva Shorebirds players
Gulf Coast Yankees players
Harrisburg Senators players
Hokkaido Nippon-Ham Fighters players
International League MVP award winners
Lancaster Barnstormers players
Major League Baseball first basemen
Major League Baseball left fielders
Major League Baseball players from Panama
Major League Baseball right fielders
Mexican League baseball first basemen
Montreal Expos players
Navegantes del Magallanes players
Panamanian expatriate baseball players in Venezuela
New York Yankees players
Newark Bears players
Nippon Professional Baseball designated hitters
Nippon Professional Baseball first basemen
Olmecas de Tabasco players
Oneonta Yankees players
Orix Buffaloes players
Orix BlueWave players
Ottawa Lynx players
Panamanian expatriate baseball players in Canada
Panamanian expatriate baseball players in Japan
Panamanian expatriate baseball players in Mexico
Panamanian expatriate baseball players in the United States
People from Bocas del Toro Province
Tampa Yankees players
Tigres del Licey players
Panamanian expatriate baseball players in the Dominican Republic
Tohoku Rakuten Golden Eagles players
Toledo Mud Hens players
West Palm Beach Expos players